Hesperia pahaska, the Pahaska skipper, is a butterfly of the family Hesperiidae.

It is found from North America in a narrow belt of states extending from Texas to North Dakota, just reaching Canada in southern Saskatchewan and Manitoba.

The wingspan is 28–33 mm. The flight period is from June to early July in the northern U.S. Its habitats include desert grassland, chaparral, open woodland and prairie hills.

The larvae feed on blue grama (Bouteloua gracilis), fluff grass (Erioneuron pulchellum), Poaceae species, and Tridens pulchella.

Subspecies
Listed alphabetically.
H. p. martini MacNeill, 1964
H. p. pahaska
H. p. williamsi Lindsey, 1940

References

External links
Pahaska Skipper, Butterflies and Moths of North America

Hesperia (butterfly)
Butterflies described in 1938